Pyrrolysine—tRNAPyl ligase (PylS, pyrrolysyl-tRNA synthetase) is an enzyme with systematic name L-pyrrolysine:tRNAPyl ligase (AMP-forming). This enzyme catalyses the following chemical reaction

 ATP + L-pyrrolysine + tRNAPyl  AMP + diphosphate + L-pyrrolysyl-tRNAPyl

This enzyme is specific for pyrrolysine as substrate as it cannot be replaced by lysine or any of the other natural amino acids.

References

External links 
 

EC 6.1.1